Mariana de Sousa Nunes (born 23 November 1980) is a Brazilian actress.

Filmography

Television

Film

Awards

References

External links

1980 births
Living people
Actresses from Brasília
Afro-Brazilian actresses
Brazilian television actresses
Brazilian film actresses
21st-century Brazilian actresses